Tsvetochny is a rural locality (a settlement) in Timiryazevskoye Rural Settlement of Maykopsky District, the Republic of Adygea, Russia. The population was 1,388 as of 2018. There are 18 streets.

Geography 
Tsvetochny is located 6 km southwest of Tulsky (the district's administrative centre) by road. Tulskaya is the nearest rural locality.

References 

Rural localities in Maykopsky District